Physician–patient privilege is a legal concept, related to medical confidentiality, that protects communications between a patient and their doctor from being used against the patient in court. It is a part of the rules of evidence in many common law jurisdictions. Almost every jurisdiction that recognizes physician–patient privilege not to testify in court, either by statute or through case law, limits the privilege to knowledge acquired during the course of providing medical services. In some jurisdictions, conversations between a patient and physician may be privileged in both criminal and civil courts.

Scope
The privilege may cover the situation where a patient confesses to a psychiatrist that they committed a particular crime. It may also cover normal inquiries regarding matters such as injuries that may result in civil action. For example, any defendant that the patient may be suing at the time cannot ask the doctor if the patient ever expressed the belief that their condition had improved. However, the rule generally does not apply to confidences shared with physicians when they are not serving in the role of medical providers.

The reasoning behind the rule is that a level of trust must exist in the doctor–patient relationship so that the physician can properly treat the patient. If the patient were fearful of telling the truth to the physician because they believed the physician would report such behavior to the authorities, the treatment process could be rendered far more difficult, or the physician could make an incorrect diagnosis.

For example, a below-age of consent patient came to a doctor with a sexually transmitted disease. The doctor is usually required to obtain a list of the patient's sexual contacts to inform them that they need treatment. This is an important health concern. However, the patient may be reluctant to divulge the names of their older sexual partners, for fear that they will be charged with statutory rape. In some jurisdictions, the doctor cannot be forced to reveal the information revealed by their patient to anyone except to particular organizations, as specified by law, and they too are required to keep that information confidential. If, in the case the police become aware of such information, they are not allowed to use it in court as proof of the sexual misconduct, except as provided by express intent of the legislative body and formalized into law.

The law in Ontario, Canada, requires that physicians report patients who, in the opinion of the physician, may be unfit to drive for medical reasons as per Section 203 of the Highway Traffic Act.

The law in New Hampshire places physician–patient communications on the same basis as attorney–client communications, except in cases where law enforcement officers seek blood or urine test samples and test results taken from a patient who is being investigated for driving while intoxicated.

United States
In the United States, the Federal Rules of Evidence do not recognize doctor–patient privilege.

At the state level, the extent of the privilege varies depending on the law of the applicable jurisdiction. For example, in Texas there is only a limited physician–patient privilege in criminal proceedings, and the privilege is limited in civil cases as well.

Australia
In New South Wales, Australia, a privilege exists for "communication made by a person in confidence to another person .... in the course of a relationship in which the confidant was acting in a professional capacity". This is often interpreted as being between a health professional and their patient.

In some jurisdictions in Australia privilege may also extend to lawyers, some victims, journalists (shield laws), and priests. It may also be invoked in a public interest, or settlement negotiations, which may also be privileged.

See also
 Privilege (evidence)
 Attorney–client privilege
 Doctor–patient relationship
 Medical privacy
 Subpoena duces tecum
 Subpoena ad testificandum

References

Health law
Privileged communication
Patient
Physicians